Zieglerville is an unincorporated community in Lower Frederick Township in Montgomery County, Pennsylvania. Its ZIP Code is 19492 and it is located on the west side of the Perkiomen Creek where PA Route 29 (Gravel Pike) and PA Route 73 (Big Rd) split at a roundabout just north of Schwenksville.

The Bridge in Upper Frederick Township was listed on the National Register of Historic Places in 1988.

Geography
Zieglerville is located at  It is 220 feet above sea level.

In popular culture
 A season 6 episode of the Discovery Channel series A Haunting, called Black Magic, takes place in Obilesk, a small town located adjacent to Zeiglersville in 2009.

References

Unincorporated communities in Montgomery County, Pennsylvania
Unincorporated communities in Pennsylvania